Epsilon Composite is a French company created in 1987 by Stephane LULL, its current CEO. Revenue in 2012 was 21M€ with 190 employees.

Epsilon Composite designs and produces a wide range of Carbon-fiber-reinforced polymer (CFRP) products for various applications:
 Manufacturing and printing machines (flexography and textile industries)
 Energy (oil & gas offshore exploitation, wind turbines)
 Civil Engineering
 Camera support equipment (tripods)
 Automotive and leisure applications
 Aerospace (Airbus and Flying Whales Tier-1 supplier)

The main production process used by the company is pultrusion.

The production site is located in Gaillan, France.

The company is regularly listed among the “key players in Carbon Fiber Reinforced Plastics Market” in independent market reports.

In 2021, one of the company's projects was selected as JEC Innovation Awards finalist in the Aerospace category.

References

External links 

Composite materials
Aerospace
Privately held companies of France
French companies established in 1987